The Road to Le Mans is a sports car racing held annually at the Circuit de la Sarthe, in Le Mans, France. It serves as a support event for the main race, the annual 24 Hours of Le Mans. The race was first run in 2016, as a one-hour event, forming part of the Michelin GT3 Le Mans Cup, in its inaugural season.

History 
The race was announced on 13 November 2015, a support race for LMP3 cars, competing in series sanctioned by the Automobile Club de l'Ouest, and GT3 cars competing in the Michelin GT3 Le Mans Cup. It would by the Automobile Club de l’Ouest with the collaboration of Le Mans Endurance Management (promoter of the Michelin GT3 Le Mans Cup Series) It was announced to be a non-championship race for the LMP3 cars, while all full-season entrants of the GT3 Le Mans Cup would receive automatic invitations to the race. For the inaugural race in 2016, a total of 39 cars were entered, with 22 LMP3 and 17 GT3 cars.  The race was the first time that GT3 and LMP3 cars had competed on the full Circuit de la Sarthe.

In 2017, the race was announced to be returning on the Le Mans support calendar, albeit with a number of changes. The event was expanded to comprise 2x 55 minute long races, with up to 46 cars competing, instead of 42 in the previous year.

Race Winners

References 


Sports car races
Auto races in France
Recurring sporting events established in 2016
2016 establishments in France
Endurance motor racing